is a Japanese tokusatsu superhero television series based on the Sailor Moon manga created by Naoko Takeuchi. It was produced by Toei Company.

Pretty Guardian Sailor Moon (commonly referred to as PGSM) was first broadcast by Chubu-Nippon Broadcasting, airing on that station in Nagoya and on the Japan News Network nationwide from October 4, 2003 to September 25, 2004. The series was a retelling of the first Sailor Moon story arc, albeit with considerable plot divergences.

The opening theme, titled , was performed by J-pop singer Nanami Yumihara under the name .

The series lasted 49 episodes (called "Acts") and also included two separate made-for-DVD specials.

Plot
In the Dark Kingdom, an organization of great evil, Queen Beryl, her generalsーthe Four Kings of Heavenー, and an amorphous evil power named Queen Metaria reside. They attempt to steal energy so that Beryl can take over the world.

Standing in their way are the Sailor Guardians, five middle-school-aged girls - perky Usagi Tsukino, genius Ami Mizuno, paranormally gifted shrine maiden Rei Hino, tomboyish Makoto Kino, and J-pop idol Minako Aino - are sworn to protect the Princess of the Moon and defeat the Dark Kingdom. Two beings that appear to be sentient, stuffed toy cats, Luna and Artemis, serve as the girls' mentors. The Guardians also encounter Tuxedo Mask, a jewel thief in search of an immensely powerful, mystical Silver Crystal belonging to the Princess of the Moon.

While searching together for the Princess of the Moon and the Silver Crystal, the initially disparate girls develop a strong bond of friendship. Additionally, Usagi struggles with her feelings for the irksome and mysterious Mamoru Chiba. Later in the series, Metaria and Sailor Moon each get too powerful to be reined in, and the conflict shifts to one in which the Sailor Guardians attempt to postpone the inevitable destruction of the planet Earth.

Alterations to the original story

While the first few episodes of the television series are based directly on the manga and anime storylines, by the time the introduction of Sailor Jupiter was broadcast, the television show began to spin off in its own direction. Many divergences between the television series and the manga and anime were introduced. Overall, the storylines for television were more character-based and character-driven. They focused more on the girls' civilian lives and their connection to the past than on action sequences.

One of the most profound changes in the television version was made to the character of Minako Aino, who, rather than being an ordinary girl among the other Sailor Guardians, was portrayed as a famous pop idol. When introduced, she is fighting crime as "Sailor V", and makes subtle reference to this double life in her music. Also, for the television series, Minako was given a debilitating head condition that causes her to have headaches, blurry vision, and fainting spells, which plague her through most of the series. She agrees to have an operation, but dies before the operation can be performed. This introduces a major change to the Sailor Guardian makeup as well, although Minako does later return for the final act.

In addition to plot changes, some updating was made to minor elements of the series, bringing them more in line with modern culture. For example, in the original anime and manga, there were scenes involving Ami and a cassette tape. In the new version, the tape is replaced by a MiniDisc. Instead of a transforming pen and communicators, each Guardian is given a bracelet and a magical camera phone. Also, their secret hideout is not hidden in a video arcade, but rather in a magic karaoke room.

With the new adaptation of the series, certain characters were modified to give it freshness and originality. The new characters included Sailor Luna, Dark Sailor Mercury, and Princess Sailor Moon. A new antagonist, Mio Kuroki, was also introduced.

Development

The popularity of the Sailor Moon musicals contributed to the decision to produce another series of Sailor Moon, and Takeuchi was more closely involved in the production than she was for the anime. The new series was first announced on September 27, 2003, after the final episode of Kirby of the Stars.

Episode list

Television

Direct-to-video

DVD specials

Pretty Guardian Sailor Moon: Special Act
A sequel to the series, set four years after the defeat of Dark Kingdom, portrays the wedding of Mamoru Chiba and Usagi Tsukino. Before their nuptials they do battle with Mio Kuroki, who has been resurrected and claims to be the new queen of Dark Kingdom. She kidnaps Mamoru and Usagi and intends to force Mamoru to marry her. The Shitennou are revived, however, and help their master to defeat Mio's monster, Sword and Shield. Meanwhile, the Sailor Guardians, excluding Sailor Mars who is hospitalized with injuries from battling Mio while in her civilian state, use the Moon Sword provided by Queen Serenity to restore their power, enabling them to transform and defeat Mio. The story ends with Usagi and Mamoru's wedding, as well as Motoki and Makoto's engagement.

Pretty Guardian Sailor Moon: Act Zero
The last special made for the series is a prequel that leads directly to the first episode. Minako Aino meets Artemis and at Christmas becomes Sailor V. She must use her newfound powers to foil a stage magician/jewel thief called Q.T. Kenko and his Killer Girl assistants. Meanwhile, Usagi and her friends decide to dress in their own homemade sailor fuku (Usagi as Sailor Rabbit, Naru as Sailor N, and their other friends, Kanami and Momoko as sailors K and M) in order to scare the thieves away from the jewellery store owned by Naru Osaka's mother, only for Usagi to get kidnapped by Kenko. The actors who portray the Four Kings of Heaven are featured as the inexperienced police officer's group self-dubbed the "Police Four Kings of Heaven" for comic relief. They consist of Captain Kuroi (Kunzite), Officer Akai (Nephrite), Officer Shiroi (Zoisite), and female Officer Hanako (Jadeite). The story ends with Luna burning through the atmosphere to come to Earth and give Usagi her powers.

Mini-episodes
Act Zero also comes with two mini-episodes. Each one is approximately five minutes long and tells a brief short story. "Hina Afterward" shows what happened to Hina after breaking off her engagement to Mamoru Chiba. "Tuxedo Mask's Secret Birth" shows the origin of the Tuxedo Mask persona. It includes a joke-transformation sequence in which, rather than transforming magically, he pulls on his clothes with dramatic flair.

Super Dance Lesson
This is a short video hosted by Luna, Sailor Jupiter, and Sailor Moon, which instructs the viewer how to perform the dances from different songs from Pretty Guardian Sailor Moon.

Kirari Super Live!
A Special Live Event occurred on May 2, 2004 at Yomiuri Hall. This Special Event was held for the 1,000 winners of the Sailormoon Campaign (a contest held earlier in the year, in which viewers had to send in UPC symbols to enter). The event combined musical performances, in which the cast members sang and danced to songs from the Pretty Guardian Sailor Moon soundtrack, and a dramatic storyline with spoken dialogue, in which the Sailor Guardians had to stop the Four Kings of Heaven from stealing the energy of the audience members. The concert was recorded and released on DVD. It also included bonus behind-the-scenes footage of the performance and interviews with the cast members.

Cast
 Miyuu Sawai as Usagi Tsukino/Sailor Moon/Princess Serenity/Princess Sailor Moon
 Rika Izumi as Ami Mizuno/Sailor Mercury/Dark Mercury
 Keiko Kitagawa as Rei Hino/Sailor Mars
 Mew Azama as Makoto Kino/Sailor Jupiter
 Ayaka Komatsu as Minako Aino/Sailor V/Sailor Venus
 Rina Koike as Sailor Luna
 Keiko Han as Luna (voice, cat form)
 Kappei Yamaguchi as Artemis (voice)
 Jouji Shibue as Mamoru Chiba/Tuxedo Kamen/Prince Endymion
 Aya Sugimoto as Queen Beryl
 Jun Masuo as Jadeite
 Hiroyuki Matsumoto as Nephrite
 Yoshito Endō as Zoisite
 Akira Kubodera as Kunzite
 Alisa Durbrow as Mio Kuroki
 Chieko Ochi as Naru Osaka
 Masaya Kikawada as Motoki Furuhata
 Kaori Moriwaka as Ikuko Tsukino
 Naoki Takeshi as Shingo Tsukino
 Moeko Matsushita as Hina Kusaka
 Narushi Ikeda as Sugao Saitou, Minako's manager
 Katsumi Shiono as Youma

Music
In March and April 2004, singles for each of the five Sailor Guardians were released with image songs on them.
Pretty Guardian Sailor Moon Original Song Album ~ Dear My Friend was released in June 2004.
A 3-CD box set, Moonlight Real Girl was published in September 2004.

DJ MOON
 Pretty Guardian Sailor Moon DJ MOON 1
 Pretty Guardian Sailor Moon DJ MOON 2
 Pretty Guardian Sailor Moon DJ MOON 3

Koro-chan Packs
 Pretty Guardian Sailor Moon Koro-chan Pack 1
 Pretty Guardian Sailor Moon Koro-chan Pack 2
 Pretty Guardian Sailor Moon Koro-chan Pack 3

Moonlight Real Girl
 Pretty Guardian Sailor Moon Moonlight Real Girl Memorial CD Box: Disc 1 Original Soundtrack “Rare Track Collection”: Michiru Ōshima
 Pretty Guardian Sailor Moon Moonlight Real Girl Memorial CD Box: Disc 2 One night limit of the special radio program series DJ Moon
 Pretty Guardian Sailor Moon Moonlight Real Girl Memorial CD Box: Disc 3 Minako Aino's original album I'll Be Here

Other albums
 Pretty Guardian Sailor Moon Original Song Album "Dear My Friend"
 Pretty Guardian Sailor Moon ~ Complete Song Collection ~

Singles
 Pretty Guardian Sailor Moon Sparkling * Sailor Dream!
 Pretty Guardian Sailor Moon Character Songs Sailor Moon Usagi Tsukino (Miyū Sawai)
 Pretty Guardian Sailor Moon Character Songs Sailor Mercury Ami Mizuno (Rika Izumi)
 Pretty Guardian Sailor Moon Character Songs Sailor Mars Rei Hino (Keiko Kitagawa)
 Pretty Guardian Sailor Moon Character Songs Sailor Jupiter Makoto Kino (Myū Azama)
 Pretty Guardian Sailor Moon Character Songs Sailor Venus Minako Aino (Ayaka Komatsu)

Distribution and reception
There are several radio programs called "DJ Moon" based on the show that originated from Chubu-Nippon Broadcasting radio and which were broadcast on other radio networks in Japan. The shows were a combination of a radio drama and promotional tool for the TV series, often foreshadowing upcoming events. These shows were later sold on CD.

In addition to the series, there was also a stage musical performance, Kirari Super Live!, by characters on the show. Some footage from the filming of the stage show was used in the television broadcast. A special limited-edition promotional video, Super Dance Lesson, was available for purchase only through order forms found in the magazines Youchien, Mebae, and Shougaku Ichinensei in July 2004.

Notes

References

See also
 Sailor Moon musicals

External links
 Fly Me to the Sailormoon The Official Toei site
 Sailormoon Channel Official Bandai site
 HICBC Official HICBC Sailor Moon site
Sailor Dream Product and show information
Three-Lights.net Magazine scans of actresses and show

Pretty Guardian Sailor Moon Review at japanhero.com
Pretty Guardian Sailor Moon review at anime news network

Sailor Moon mass media
2003 Japanese television series debuts
2004 Japanese television series endings
Japanese fantasy television series
Japanese television dramas based on manga
Magical girl television series
Superheroine television shows
Television shows written by Yasuko Kobayashi
Toei tokusatsu
Tokusatsu television series